Neocalyptis aperta is a species of moth of the family Tortricidae. It is found in India and Myanmar.

The ground colour of the forewings is white with black markings, represented by a series of medium-sized sharp elements resembling hieroglyphs.

References

	

Moths described in 1952
Neocalyptis